Spalding was a rural district in Holland in Lincolnshire, England from 1894 to 1974.

It was formed under the Local Government Act 1894 from the Spalding rural sanitary district.  Spalding itself constituted a separate urban district.

It was expanded in 1932 under a County Review Order, by including Crowland Rural District (which consisted of a single parish).

It was abolished in 1974 under the Local Government Act 1972, going on to form part of the South Holland district.

References
https://web.archive.org/web/20071001002735/http://www.visionofbritain.org.uk/relationships.jsp?u_id=10027093

Rural districts of the Parts of Holland
Districts of England created by the Local Government Act 1894
Districts of England abolished by the Local Government Act 1972